The following is a list of episodes of the television series Thomas & Friends.

Series overview

Series 1 (1984–85)

Series 2 (1986)

Series 3 (1991–92)

Series 4 (1994–95)

Series 5 (1998)

Series 6 (2002)

Series 7 (2003)

Series 8 (2004) 
Series 8 – present, The rest of the series takes place in the same years when their films and episodes have aired.

Series 9 (2005)

Series 10 (2006)

Series 11 (2007-08)

Series 12 (2008)

Series 13 (2010)

Series 14 (2010)

Series 15 (2011)

Series 16 (2012)

Series 17 (2013–14)

Series 18 (2014–15)

Series 19 (2015–16)

Series 20 (2016–17)

Series 21 (2017)

Series 22 (2018–19)

Series 23 (2019–20)

Series 24 (2020–21)

Movies (2000–present)

References

Notes

Citations

Lists of British children's television series episodes
British railway-related lists
Episodes